The 69th Cannes Film Festival was held from 11 to 22 May 2016. Australian director George Miller was the President of the Jury for the main competition. French actor Laurent Lafitte was the host for the opening and closing ceremonies. On 15 March it was announced that Japanese director Naomi Kawase would serve as the Cinéfondation and Short Film Jury president. American director Woody Allen's film Café Society opened the festival.

The Palme d'Or was awarded to the British film I, Daniel Blake directed by Ken Loach, which also served as closing film of the festival. At a press conference, Loach said that he was "quietly stunned" to win.

Juries

Main competition
George Miller, Australian film director, Jury President
Arnaud Desplechin, French film director
Kirsten Dunst, American actress
Valeria Golino, Italian actress and film director
Mads Mikkelsen, Danish actor
László Nemes, Hungarian film director
Vanessa Paradis, French actress and singer
Katayoon Shahabi, Iranian film producer
Donald Sutherland, Canadian actor

Un Certain Regard
Marthe Keller, Swiss actress, President
Jessica Hausner, Austrian film director
Diego Luna, Mexican actor and film director
Ruben Östlund, Swedish film director
Céline Sallette, French actress

Caméra d'or
Catherine Corsini, French film director and actress, President
Jean-Christophe Berjon, French film critic
Alexander Rodnyansky, Ukrainian film producer 
Isabelle Frilley, French CEO of Titra Film
Jean-Marie Dreujou, French cinematographer

Cinéfondation and short films
Naomi Kawase, Japanese film director, President
Marie-Josée Croze, Franco-Canadian actress
Jean-Marie Larrieu, French film director
Radu Muntean, Romanian film director
Santiago Loza, Argentine film director and playwright

Independent juries
Nespresso Grand Prize (International Critics' Week)
Valérie Donzelli, French film director and actress, President
Alice Winocour, French film director
Nadav Lapid, Israeli film director
David Robert Mitchell, American film director
Santiago Mitre, Argentine film director

L'Œil d'or
Gianfranco Rosi, Italian documentary film director, President
Anne Aghion, French-American documentary film director
Natacha Régnier, Belgian actress 
Thierry Garrel, French artistic consultant and director of documentaries for Arte TV
Amir Labaki, Brazilian film critic and curator

Queer Palm
Olivier Ducastel and Jacques Martineau, French film directors, Presidents
Emilie Brisavoine, French film director and actress
João Federici, Brazilian artistic director of Festival MixBrasil
Marie Sauvion, French film journalist

Official selection

In competition
The films competing in the main competition section for the Palme d'Or were announced at a press conference on 14 April 2016: The Salesman, directed by Asghar Farhadi was added to the competition lineup on 22 April 2016. The Palme d'Or winner has been highlighted.

(QP) indicates film eligible for the Queer Palm.

Un Certain Regard
The films competing in the Un Certain Regard section were announced at a press conference on 14 April 2016: Clash, directed by Mohamed Diab, was announced as the opening film for the Un Certain Regard section. Hell or High Water, directed by David Mackenzie was added to the Un Certain Regard lineup on 22 April 2016.  The Un Certain Regard Prize winner has been highlighted.

(CdO) indicates film eligible for the Caméra d'Or as directorial debut feature. - (QP) film eligible for the Queer Palm.

Out of competition
The following films were selected to screen out of competition:

(ŒdO) indicates film eligible for the Œil d'or as documentary.

Special screenings

(ŒdO) film eligible for the Œil d'or as documentary. - (QP) film eligible for the Queer Palm.

Cinéfondation
The Cinéfondation section focuses on films made by students at film schools. The following 18 entries (14 fiction films and 4 animation films) were selected out of 2,300 submissions. More than one-third of the films selected represent schools participating in Cinéfondation for the first time. It is also the first time that a film representing Bosnian and Venezuelan film schools have been selected. More than half of the films selected were directed by women. The winner of the Cinéfondation First Prize has been highlighted.

Short films
Out of 5,008 entries, the following films were selected to compete for the Short Film Palme d'Or. The Short film Palme d'Or winner has been highlighted.

Cannes Classics
The full line-up for the Cannes Classics section was announced on 20 April 2016.

(CdO) indicates film eligible for the Caméra d'Or as directorial debut feature. - (ŒdO) film eligible for the Œil d'or as documentary.

Cinéma de la Plage
The Cinéma de la Plage is a part of the Official Selection of the festival. The outdoors screenings at the beach cinema of Cannes are open to the public.

Parallel sections

International Critics' Week
The full selection for the International Critics' Week section was announced on 18 April 2016, at the section's website. In Bed with Victoria, directed by Justine Triet was selected as the opening film for the International Critics' Week section, while the short films Bonne Figure, directed by Sandrine Kiberlain, En Moi, directed by Laetitia Casta, and Kitty, directed by Chloë Sevigny were selected as its closing films.

Feature films - The winner of the Nespresso Grand Prize has been highlighted.

(CdO) indicates film eligible for the Caméra d'Or as directorial debut feature. - (QP) film eligible for the Queer Palm.

Shorts films - The winner of the Discovery Award for Short Film has been highlighted.

Special screenings

(CdO) indicates film eligible for the Caméra d'Or as directorial debut feature. - (QP) film eligible for the Queer Palm.

Directors' Fortnight
The full selection for the Directors' Fortnight section was announced on 19 April 2016, at the section's website.  Sweet Dreams, directed by Marco Bellocchio was selected as the opening film for the Directors' Fortnight section and Dog Eat Dog, directed by Paul Schrader was selected as the closing film for the Directors' Fortnight section.

Feature films - The winner of the Art Cinema Award has been highlighted.

(CdO) film eligible for the Caméra d'Or as directorial debut feature. - (ŒdO) film eligible for the Œil d'or as documentary. - (QP) film eligible for the Queer Palm.

Short films - The winner of the Illy Prize for Short Film has been highlighted.

ACID
The Association for Independent Cinema and its Distribution (ACID), an association of French and foreign film directors, demonstrates its support for nine films each year, seeking to provide support from filmmakers to other filmmakers. The full ACID selection was announced on 19 April 2016, at the section's website.

(QP) indicates film eligible for the Queer Palm.

Awards

Official awards
In Competition
 Palme d'Or: I, Daniel Blake by Ken Loach
 Grand Prix: It's Only the End of the World by Xavier Dolan
 Best Director:
 Cristian Mungiu for Graduation
 Olivier Assayas for Personal Shopper
 Best Screenplay: Asghar Farhadi for The Salesman
 Best Actress: Jaclyn Jose for Ma' Rosa
 Best Actor: Shahab Hosseini for The Salesman
 Jury Prize: American Honey by Andrea Arnold
 Honorary Palme d'Or: Jean-Pierre Léaud

Un Certain Regard
 Un Certain Regard Award: The Happiest Day in the Life of Olli Mäki by Juho Kuosmanen
 Un Certain Regard Jury Prize: Harmonium by Kōji Fukada
 Un Certain Regard Award for Best Director: Matt Ross for Captain Fantastic
 Un Certain Regard Award for Best Screenplay: Delphine Coulin and Muriel Coulin for The Stopover
 Un Certain Regard Special Prize: The Red Turtle by Michael Dudok de Wit

Cinéfondation
 First Prize: Anna by Or Sinai
 Second Prize: In the Hills by Hamid Ahmadi
 Third Prize: The Noise of Licking by Nadja Andrasev & The Guilt, Probably by Michael Labarca

Golden Camera
 Caméra d'Or: Divines by Houda Benyamina

Short Films
 Short Film Palme d'Or: Timecode by Juanjo Giménez
 Special Mention: The Girl Who Danced with the Devil by João Paulo Miranda Maria

Independent awards
FIPRESCI Prizes
 Toni Erdmann by Maren Ade (In Competition)
 Dogs by Bogdan Mirică (Un Certain Regard)
 Raw by Julia Ducournau (International Critics' Week)

Vulcan Award of the Technical Artist
 Vulcan Award: Ryu Seong-hie (art direction) for The Handmaiden

Ecumenical Jury
 Prize of the Ecumenical Jury: It's Only the End of the World by Xavier Dolan
 Commendations:
 I, Daniel Blake by Ken Loach
 American Honey by Andrea Arnold

Awards in the frame of International Critics' Week
 Nespresso Grand Prize: Mimosas by Oliver Laxe
 France 4 Visionary Award: Album by Mehmet Can Mertoğlu
 SACD Award: Diamond Island by Davy Chou
 Leica Cine Discovery Prize for Short Film: Prenjak by Wregas Bhanuteja
 Canal+ Award: Birth of a Leader by Antoine de Bary
 Gan Foundation Support for Distribution Award: One Week and a Day by Asaph Polonsky

Awards in the frame of Directors' Fortnight
 Art Cinema Award: Wolf and Sheep by Shahrbanoo Sadat
 SACD Award: The Together Project by Sólveig Anspach
 SACD special mention: Divines by Houda Benyamina
 Europa Cinemas Label Award: Mercenary by Sacha Wolff
 Illy Prize for Short Film: Chasse Royal by Lise Akoka and Romane Gueret
 Illy special mention: The Beast by Miroslav Sikavica

L'Œil d'or Jury
 L'Œil d'or: Cinema Novo by Eryk Rocha
 Special Mention: The Cinema Travelers by Shirley Abraham and Amit Madheshiya

Queer Palm Jury
 Queer Palm Award: The Lives of Thérèse by Sébastien Lifshitz
 Short Film Queer Palm: Gabber Lover by Anna Cazenave Cambet

Palm Dog Jury
 Palm Dog Award: Nellie for Paterson
 Grand Jury Prize: Jacques for In Bed with Victoria
 Palm Dog Manitarian Award: Ken Loach for showcasing a three-legged dog named Shea in I, Daniel Blake

Prix François Chalais
 François Chalais Prize: The Student by Kirill Serebrennikov

Cannes Soundtrack Award
 Cliff Martinez for The Neon Demon

References

External links

Official website Retrospective 2016 
69ème Festival de Cannes
Cannes Film Festival: Awards for 2016 at Internet Movie Database

2016 festivals in Europe
2016 film festivals
2016 in French cinema
2016
May 2016 events in France